Nelson H. "N.H." Manning (1832 – ?) was an American politician.

Born in Vermont, Manning came to Minnesota in 1857. He was a farmer. He served in the Minnesota House of Representatives in 1874 from Windom, Minnesota.

Notes

1832 births
Year of death unknown
People from Vermont
People from Windom, Minnesota
Members of the Minnesota House of Representatives